It’s Lulu is a British television program hosted by Lulu that was produced between 1970 and 1973 by Stewart Morris, Colin Charman, John Ammonds and Vernon Lawrence, and broadcast on BBC1. Episodes 1, 2, 5, 6, 9 and 10 of series 3 were repeated on BBC2 in a different running order under the banner ‘’Show Of The Week: It’s Lulu’’ from Thursday 25–5 July September 1974.

Episodes

External links

References 

British music television shows